In mathematics, a relatively compact subspace (or relatively compact subset, or precompact subset)  of a topological space  is a subset whose closure is compact.

Properties
Every subset of a compact topological space is relatively compact (since a closed subset of a compact space is compact). And in an arbitrary topological space every subset of a relatively compact set is relatively compact.

Every compact subset of a Hausdorff space is relatively compact. In a non-Hausdorff space, such as the particular point topology on an infinite set, the closure of a compact subset is not necessarily compact; said differently, a compact subset of a non-Hausdorff space is not necessarily relatively compact.

Every compact subset of a (possibly non-Hausdorff) topological vector space is complete and relatively compact.

Some major theorems characterize relatively compact subsets, in particular in function spaces. An example is the Arzelà–Ascoli theorem. Other cases of interest relate to uniform integrability, and the concept of normal family in complex analysis. Mahler's compactness theorem in the geometry of numbers characterizes relatively compact subsets in certain non-compact homogeneous spaces (specifically spaces of lattices).

Counterexample
As a counterexample take any neighbourhood of the particular point of an infinite particular point space. The neighbourhood itself may be compact but is not relatively compact because its closure is the whole non-compact space.

Almost periodic functions 

The definition of an almost periodic function  at a conceptual level has to do with the translates of  being a relatively compact set. This needs to be made precise in terms of the topology used, in a particular theory.

See also 

 Compactly embedded
 Totally bounded space

References 

 page 12 of V. Khatskevich, D.Shoikhet, Differentiable Operators and Nonlinear Equations, Birkhäuser Verlag AG, Basel, 1993, 270 pp. at google books

Properties of topological spaces
Compactness (mathematics)